{|

{{Infobox ship characteristics
|Hide header=
|Header caption=
|Ship class=
|Ship displacement=
|Ship length=
|Ship beam= 
|Ship height=
|Ship draught=
|Ship draft=
|Ship power= (CODAG)
|Ship propulsion=1 gas turbine, 2 diesels, 2 shafts
|Ship speed=
Economy 
Maximum 
|Ship range= at 15 knots
|Ship endurance=*21 days with logistic support
10 days autonomous
|Ship complement=93 including aviation officers, with accommodation for up to 106
|Ship sensors=*GENESIS CMS
SMART-S Mk2 search radar
Sonar, GPS, LAN, ECDIS
UniMACS 3000 IPMS
X-band radar, Fire control radar
|Ship EW=Aselsan ARES-2N
Others: Laser/RF systems, ASW jammers, SSTD
|Ship armament=*Guns:
 1 ×  OTO Melara Super Rapid
 2 × 12.7 mm Aselsan STAMP
Anti-surface missiles:
 8 × Harpoon
Anti-aircraft missiles:
 21 × RAM (PDMS)Torpedoes:
 2 × 324 mm Mk.32 triple launchers for Mk.46 torpedoes
|Ship armour=
|Ship armor=
|Ship aircraft=
|Ship aircraft facilities=*Hangar and platform for:
 S-70B Seahawk ASW helicopters
 Unmanned aerial vehicles (UAV)
|Ship notes=Capability of storing armaments, 20 tons of JP-5 aircraft fuel, aerial refueling (HIRF) and maintenance systems
}}
|}

TCG Burgazada (F-513) is an Ada-class ASW corvette of the Turkish Navy, built as the third combat ship of the MILGEM project. Burgazada was named after Burgazada Island, which is part of the Prince Islands archipelago in the Sea of Marmara, to the southeast of Istanbul.

The construction of TCG Burgazada began on 17 December 2014 at the Istanbul Naval Shipyard as the third combat ship of the[MILGEM project. She was launched on 21 June 2016. After outfitting works, sea trials began in March 2018. She was commissioned on 4 November 2018.

TCG Burgazada'' is an  corvette featuring a landing platform for ASW/ASuW helicopters, and is teamed with Harpoon anti-surface missiles and a  OTO Melara Super Rapid gun. She is equipped with the indigenously-developed combat management system GENESIS.

References

Ada-class corvettes of the Turkish Navy
Ships built at Istanbul Naval Shipyard
2018 ships